Rönneholm Castle is located  in Eslöv Municipality, Scania,  Sweden.

The history of the estate  dates back to the early Middle Ages.  
The original construction period is unknown. It was rebuilt in 1811 in the French Renaissance style and remodeled in 1882 with the addition of a third floor. In 1941  the building was ravaged by a fire but was restored.  For much of the 20th century, the castle served as a sanatorium.

See also
List of castles in Sweden

References

Castles in Skåne County